The men's Greco-Roman welterweight competition at the 1964 Summer Olympics in Tokyo took place from 16 to 19 October at the Komazawa Gymnasium. Nations were limited to one competitor.

Competition format

This Greco-Roman wrestling competition continued to use the "bad points" elimination system introduced at the 1928 Summer Olympics for Greco-Roman and at the 1932 Summer Olympics for freestyle wrestling, as adjusted at the 1960 Summer Olympics. Each bout awarded 4 points. If the victory was by fall, the winner received 0 and the loser 4. If the victory was by decision, the winner received 1 and the loser 3. If the bout was tied, each wrestler received 2 points. A wrestler who accumulated 6 or more points was eliminated. Rounds continued until there were 3 or fewer uneliminated wrestlers. If only 1 wrestler remained, he received the gold medal. If 2 wrestlers remained, point totals were ignored and they faced each other for gold and silver (if they had already wrestled each other, that result was used). If 3 wrestlers remained, point totals were ignored and a round-robin was held among those 3 to determine medals (with previous head-to-head results, if any, counting for this round-robin).

Results

Round 1

 Bouts

 Points

Round 2

Only 3 of the 19 wrestlers were eliminated. Of the remaining 16, Zoghian had the fewest points, at 1.

 Bouts

 Points

Round 3

Six of the 16 wrestlers were eliminated. Of the remaining 10, 4 had 5 points, 4 had 4 points, and 2 (Dubicki and Schiermeyer) led with 3 points.

 Bouts

 Points

Round 4

In a round with potential to eliminate up to 9 of the 10 wrestlers, only 6 were in fact eliminated. The only match where it was guaranteed that at least one wrestler would continue was Rizmayer (4 points) against Dubicki (3 points); all 5 of the other matches had potential for double elimination. Kolesov and Petkov each remained in contention with wins by fall (a win by decision would have eliminated each wrestler). Ţăranu was eliminated despite winning, picking up his 6th point due to the win being by decision. The Nyström vs. Camilleri bout would have resulted in double-elimination if tied, but Nyström won and therefore remained in competition.

 Bouts

 Points

Round 5

All four wrestlers started the round even at 5 points. Both bouts were drawn, leaving all four wrestlers eliminated at the same time and with the same score of 7 points. A final round was needed to finish the four-way round-robin.

 Bouts

 Points

Final round

The four-way round-robin to determine the top 4 places carried over three results from prior rounds, all ties: Kolesov and Petkov in round 3, Kolesov and Nyström in round 5, and Petkov and Dubicki in round 5. In the final round, Kolesov began with by defeating Dubicki; Kolesov therefore finished at 1-0-2 (5 points). Petkov and Nyström tied, so Petkov finished at 0-0-3 (6 points). Nyström and Dubicki then tied; Nyström finished at 0-0-3 (6 points) to match Petkov, while Dubicki had the only loss of the round-robin for a 0-1-2 (7 points) finish. With Petkov and Nyström even at 6 points in the round-robin and tied head-to-head, total bad points was used as the next tie-breaker to give Petkov the silver medal.

 Bouts

 Points

References

Wrestling at the 1964 Summer Olympics